The Shire of Dunmunkle was a local government area about  west of Bendigo and  east of Horsham, in western Victoria, Australia. The shire was bounded by the Yarriambiack Creek on the western boundary and the Richardson River on the east.

History

Dunmunkle was first incorporated as a shire on 28 September 1877. In May 1916, the shire lost part of its North Riding to the Shire of Donald, but gained parts of the South and East Ridings of the Shire of Warracknabeal.

On 20 January 1995, the Shire of Dunmunkle was abolished, and along with parts of the Shires of Karkarooc, Warracknabeal and Wimmera, was merged into the newly created Shire of Yarriambiack. The Avon-Richardson district was transferred to the newly created Shire of Northern Grampians.

Wards

The Shire of Dunmunkle was divided into three wards, each of which elected three councillors:
 North Ward
 West Ward
 East Ward

Towns and localities
 Ashens
 Avon Plains
 Banyena
 Burrereo
 Burrum
 Coromby
 Jackson
 Kewell
 Laen
 Lallat
 Lubeck
 Minyip
 Murtoa
 Nullan
 Raluana
 Rupanyup*
 Rupanyup South
 Wirchilleba

* Council seat.

Population

* Estimate in the 1958 Victorian Year Book.

References

External links
 Victorian Places - Dunmunkle Shire

Dunmunkle